Sydney White is a 2007 American teen romantic comedy film directed by Joe Nussbaum and written by Chad Gomez Creasey based on the story of "Snow White". The film, starring Amanda Bynes, Sara Paxton and Matt Long, was released theatrically on September 21, 2007 by Universal Pictures.

Plot
Teenager Sydney White sets off to attend college at SAU and pledge to her mother's sorority. She become friends with Demetria Rosemead "Dinky" Hotchkiss, also an incoming member of the Kappa Sorority. While on their way to their dorm, she meets Tyler Prince, the president of a popular fraternity and the on-off boyfriend of the student council president and Kappa Sorority head, Rachel Witchburn. Rachel checks out her university's website that ranks the "hottest" in the school several times a day, and is always number one on the list. Tyler meets Sydney and is immediately smitten, while Rachel watches from her window. Sydney's unique and tomboyish personality gradually propels her popularity on the university website, making Rachel jealous.

As one of the Kappa Sorority's traditional initiation rituals, the freshmen need to find a date late at midnight. Sydney finds Lenny, one of a group of social outcasts called the “seven dorks”, who live in a run-down house known as the Vortex. Rachel instructs Sydney to ditch her date, leaving Lenny to pay. Rachel blocks Sydney's induction into Kappa by falsely claiming Sydney has lied about her background and cheated on a Kappa quiz. Sydney leaves that night in the rain and goes to sit in front of the Vortex, where she is welcomed by the seven dorks.

Sydney and the seven dorks try to bring Rachel down from her student council position by running one of the dorks, Terrence, for student body president. He is soon disqualified and Sydney replaces him as a presidential candidate. Sydney's stance against elitism on campus earns her respect from different cliques and she gets the number one rank on the school's "hottest" website.

The day before the debate and election, Rachel hires a hacker to destroy Sydney's files using a virus called 'The Poison Apple.' Sydney is then forced to stay up all night in the library doing her work. When Sydney finishes, she falls asleep and is almost disqualified for not showing up, but Tyler wakes her with a kiss just in time. Sydney wins the debate and the election, becoming the new president, while Rachel is stripped of her Kappa sisterhood privileges by her sisters because of the years of cruelty she bestowed on both her Kappa sisters and the students at the University as well as lying and cheating during the election.

The film ends with Sydney's father and other construction workers fixing the Vortex. And, according to Sydney's narration, they all lived "dorkily ever after".

Cast

 Amanda Bynes as Sydney White (Snow White)
 Cree Ivey as young Sydney 
 Sara Paxton as Rachel Witchburn (Evil Queen)
 Matt Long as Tyler Prince (Prince Charming)
 John Schneider as Paul White
 Crystal Hunt as Demetria Rosemead "Dinky" Hotchkiss (Rose Red)
 Jack Carpenter as Lenny (Sneezy)
 Jeremy Howard as Terrence (Doc)
 Adam Hendershott as Jeremy (Bashful)
 Danny Strong as Gurkin (Grumpy)
 Samm Levine as Spanky (Happy)
 Arnie Pantoja as George (Dopey)
 Donté Bonner as Embele (Sleepy)
 Brian Patrick Clarke as Professor Carleton
 Libby Mintz as Christy
 Lisandra Vazquez as Amy
 Lauren Leech as Katy
 Kierstin Koppel as Goth girl

Production
Principal photography took place in and around Orlando from February 14, 2007 to April 4, 2007. Filming locations included the University of Central Florida, Rollins College, and University High School (Orlando).

Reception

Box office
Sydney White opened on September 21, 2007 in the United States in 2,104 venues. In its opening weekend, the film earned $5,196,380 in the box office, ranking sixth place and third of the week's new releases. At the end of its run, the film grossed $11,892,415 domestically and $1,727,660 overseas for a worldwide total of $13,620,075. Based on an estimated $16.5 million budget, the film was a box office bomb.

Critical response
On Rotten Tomatoes, the film holds a 36% rating based on 84 reviews with an average rating of 4.94/10. The website's critical consensus reads: "Amanda Bynes is charming, but Sydney White is a poorly adapted take on Snow White, relying on tired ethnic stereotypes laughs." On Metacritic, the film had an average score of 45 out of 100, based on reviews from 21 critics, indicating "Mixed or average reviews". Audiences surveyed by CinemaScore gave the film a grade "A−" on scale of A to F.

See also
 Revenge of the Nerds
 The House Bunny

References

External links

 
 
 
 

2007 films
2007 romantic comedy films
2000s teen comedy films
American romantic comedy films
American teen comedy films
Films about fraternities and sororities
Films based on Snow White
Films directed by Joe Nussbaum
Films scored by Deborah Lurie
Films shot in Florida
Morgan Creek Productions films
Universal Pictures films
2000s English-language films
2000s American films